The Thunderer (Jerry Carstairs) is a fictional character, a superhero appearing in American comic books published by Timely Comics.

Publication history
He first appeared in Daring Mystery Comics #7 (Timely, April 1941) and was created by John Compton and Carl Burgos. He returned in issue #8 (Jan 1942). In All Winners Comics #6 (Sept 1942), he changed his hero name to the Black Avenger. This was his last Golden Age appearance.  The Thunderer wore a red costume with blue highlights, but the color scheme was reversed on the covers.

Fictional character biography
Frustrated that the United States did not seem to be dealing with crime or Nazi saboteurs, radio operator Jerry Carstairs created a costume with a built-in microphone and fought for justice as the Thunderer. In his first recorded appearance, Jerry learned that radio station WWLX was really a front for Nazi Fifth Columnists who were transmitting secret messages hidden in music. Learning that they were targeting his girlfriend Eileen Conroy, a newspaper reporter, he foiled their operation. In order to protect his secret identity, Jerry acted like a meek weakling while in his civilian guise. Thunderer later uncovered the machinations of a hideously deformed dwarf named Gore who hated beautiful people so much that he rigged Morse code death traps that killed his victims over the radio. The Thunderer destroyed his operation, and Gore was killed in a house fire caused by faulty wiring in his equipment.

Thunderer's activities were few and far between due to the limitations his position with the FCC provided in giving him leads to criminal or spy activities. The Thunderer briefly changed his name (but not his costume) to the Black Avenger. In the fall of 1942, the FBI caught a Nazi spy that resembled Jerry and convinced him to go undercover to try and expose the spy ring that was sending defense secrets back to Nazi Germany. As the Black Avenger, Jerry managed to round up the Nazis including their leader Kurt Weidner and turn him over to justice

Alongside a number of other heroes, the Thunderer participated in an air drop on a Nazi stronghold.

The Thunderer attended a reunion of World War II costumed heroes.

In 1943, the Black Avenger was among a number of heroes who were slain by the Cosmic Cube-wielding Red Skull and impaled on a massive wall. However, the Cosmic Cube was recovered by Private Paul Anslen who resurrected all the slain heroes who aided the combined efforts of the Invaders and the time displaced New Avengers and Mighty Avengers. When Red Skull was defeated, the heroes used the Cosmic Cube to wipe out the Black Avenger's memories of the event to preserve history.

During the "Last Days" part of the Secret Wars storyline, Thunderer is seen as a resident of Valhalla Villas (a retirement home for ex-heroes and ex-villains in Miami). He was temporarily de-aged during the Incursion between Earth-616 and Earth-1610.

In Marvel Comics #1000, it was revealed that Jerry was a subject in a side project of Project Rebirth, the government project that created Captain America, called Project Thunderer. Thunderer's mask is a magical item called the Eternity Mask, which was created by a group of renegade occultists from Eternity's own substance during the days of King Arthur. When his friend William Naslund, the Spirit of '76 (as Captain America) was killed by the android Adam II, Thunderer blamed the Scientists' Guild, also known as the Three Xs and later the Enclave, for their role in Naslund's death as they were responsible for bankrolling Professor Horton to create another android like the Human Torch, as well as supplying Adam-II's programming with the Three Xs's ideas for the next stage of mankind, leading to the android's madness. Changing his identity to Dark Avenger, Carstairs swears to take down the Three Xs. However, Carstairs was killed and the Eternity Mask taken by the Enclave. His corpse would be found by Marvel Boy, with a recording to stop the Scientists Guild.

Powers and abilities
Thunderer is a good hand-to-hand combatant.

Due to the construction of his costume, Thunderer is capable of deafening people or leveling buildings with his sonic scream.

In other media
The Thunderer appeared in the Spider-Man five-part episode "Six Forgotten Warriors", voiced by Hansford Rowe. This version's powers are the result of a flawed attempt at recreating the process that empowered Captain America and are regulated by a special ring. During World War II, the Thunderer fought alongside Captain America, the Black Marvel, the Destroyer, Miss America, and the Whizzer. After Captain America apparently sacrificed himself to stop the Red Skull from activating a Doomsday machine, Thunderer and the other heroes took possession of the machine's activation keys and retired. In the present, the Kingpin sends the Insidious Six to gather the keys. The Thunderer is the last to be located, as he had stayed close to the base the Doomsday machine was held in to guard it while disguised as a homeless man. The Thunderer later joins forces with the other heroes, Captain America, and Spider-Man in fighting the Kingpin's, and later the Red Skull's, forces.

References

External links
 Thunderer at Comic Vine
 Thunderer at International Hero
 

Characters created by Carl Burgos
Comics characters introduced in 1941
Fictional characters who can manipulate sound
Fictional World War II veterans
Golden Age superheroes
Marvel Comics American superheroes
Marvel Comics male superheroes
Timely Comics characters